Northern Ireland Friends of Israel is a group dedicated to fostering better relations between Northern Ireland and the State of Israel. 

The group was launched by the deputy ambassador of Israel, Talya Lador-Fresher, president of the Board of Deputies of British Jews, Henry Grunwald and former First Minister Ian Paisley on 12 March 2009 in Belfast at the Great Hall, Stormont.

Until his death on 3 November 2009, Lord Leonard Steinberg served as president. The current president is Gerald Steinberg and the co-chairmen are Steven Jaffe and Andrew Shaw.

The mission statement of Northern Ireland Friends of Israel was launched at a meeting at the Park Avenue Belfast on 6 May 2009 in the presence of the ambassador of Israel, Ron Prosor. The mission statement calls for positive engagement with those who seek "a lasting and just peace between Israel and its neighbours".

See also
Labour Friends of Israel
Conservative Friends of Israel
Liberal Democrat Friends of Israel
European Friends of Israel
Friends of Israel Initiative

External links
 http://www.nifi.org.uk

References

2009 establishments in Northern Ireland
Israel friendship associations
Israel–United Kingdom relations
Jewish Irish history
Jews and Judaism in Northern Ireland
Organizations established in 2009
Political advocacy groups in Northern Ireland
United Kingdom friendship associations